Bool Island (also called Paligisan and Buol) is an island off the north-west coast of Sulawesi, Indonesia. It lies within Toli-Toli Regency of Central Sulawesi Province.

References

Islands of Sulawesi
Landforms of Central Sulawesi